Kuala Sungai Buloh is a small fisherman's town in Kuala Selangor District, Selangor, Malaysia. This town is located about 10 kilometres south of Kuala Selangor town, near the mouth of the river named Sungai Buloh. The Town of Sungai Buloh near Kuala Lumpur is named after the same river.

External links 

 A visitor's impressions of the town, with photographs

Kuala Selangor District
Towns in Selangor